Bandar Malaysia is a 486-acre mixed-use, transit-oriented development by 1Malaysia Development Berhad (1MDB) located at Kuala Lumpur, Malaysia. This project will be built at the current Sungai Besi Air Base site over 20 years. It is planned as a central transport hub connecting high-speed rail to Singapore (via the now-cancelled Kuala Lumpur-Singapore High Speed Rail), Mass Rapid Transit, KTM Komuter, Express Rail Link, and 12 other highways with an estimated gross development value (GDV) of over RM140 billion. Bandar Malaysia was slated to be a hub for global multinationals and Fortune Global 500 companies, and has the opportunity to become a game-changer for foreign investors in Malaysia. The project was ready to start by early 2021, after the settlement of a RM1.24bil payment to the Federal Government by IWH-CREC but was pushed back to a later date.

The development, in fact, had been initially expected to kick-off in March 2020 but was delayed by the pandemic. A source had expressed their confidence that the project will be resumed at a later date, given the uncertainties brought about by the current COVID-19 pandemic outbreak in the country.

Background
On 28 May 2011, Bandar Malaysia project was announced by Malaysia's 6th Prime Minister, Dato' Sri Najib Razak with a public-private partnership model. The project has an estimated cumulative gross development value of RM 150 billion. Master planner appointed for architecture drawing was Skidmore, Owings & Merrill.

With this development, the current Royal Malaysian Air Force airbase at Sungai Besi Air Base is to be relocated to Sendayan, Negeri Sembilan for RM 2.7 billion, of which RM1.1 billion is funded by the government and the rest by 1MDB. This relocation project is managed by Perbadanan Perwira Harta Malaysia, a subsidiary of the Armed Forces Fund Board Malaysia known as Lembaga Tabung Angkatan Tentera.

In December 2015, 1MDB sold 60% stake of Bandar Malaysia to the consortium of IWH-CREC Sdn Bhd, which consists of Tan Sri Lim Kang Hoo's Iskandar Waterfront Holdings Bhd and China's China Railway Engineering Sdn Bhd for RM 7.41 billion. However the deal fell apart on 3 May 2016 with the reason of failure to meet payment obligations announced by Ministry of Finance of Malaysia (which owned 1MDB).

In May 2017, Dato' Sri Najib Razak visited to Beijing, China for One Belt One Road Forum. In a joint conference at Sofitel Beijing Hotel with Wanda Dalian Group, Wanda Dalian Group expressed deep interest to participate in Bandar Malaysia but abandoned its interest months later.

In July 2017, Ministry of Finance launched a request for proposal and up to seven Chinese and two Japanese companies have submitted proposals said to be valued between RM30 billion and RM43 billion for the Bandar Malaysia project but no further elaboration were made by the Ministry of Finance.

On 14 July 2021, it was announced the deal between China Railway Engineering Corp and Iskandar Waterfront Holdings will not proceed given the deal lapsed on 6 May with failure to meet conditions.

Proposed interchange stations
MRT
MRT Putrajaya Line: two stations have been confirmed, Bandar Malaysia North and Bandar Malaysia South.
MRT Circle Line: as a proposed interchange station for Bandar Malaysia South but it was later on scrapped.
ERL (proposed)
Kuala Lumpur–Singapore high-speed rail (proposed)
KTM ETS (proposed)
KTM Komuter Seremban Line (proposed)
BRT (shelved)

See also
 1Malaysia Development Berhad
 KL Sentral
Tun Razak Exchange
Malaysian National Projects

References

External links
Bandar Malaysia Official Website
Bandar Malaysia Brochure (PDF)
1MDB - Bandar Malaysia
Bandar Malaysia Master Plan Illustration by Skidmore, Owings & Merrill LLP
Bandar Malaysia Resources Page
Bandar Malaysia - Razak City Residences

Geography of Kuala Lumpur
1Malaysia